The snakescale leaf-toed gecko (Hemidactylus ophiolepis) is a species of gecko. It is found in Ethiopia and Somaliland.

References

Hemidactylus
Reptiles of Ethiopia
Reptiles of Somalia
Reptiles described in 1903
Taxa named by George Albert Boulenger